Pedro Julio Astacio (born November 28, 1968) is a former Major League Baseball pitcher. He has played for the Los Angeles Dodgers (1992–1997), Colorado Rockies (1997–2001), Houston Astros (2001), New York Mets (2002–2003), Boston Red Sox (2004), Texas Rangers (2005), the San Diego Padres (2005) and the Washington Nationals (2006). In 2007, Astacio signed a contract with the Nationals' Triple-A affiliate, the Columbus Clippers, but they released him in May.

Biography 
Astacio made national news when he tossed a shutout and fanned 10 in his major-league debut.  Through 2021, he was the last pitcher to do this on his debut, and the first since Luis Tiant in 1964.   

He proceeded to record four shutouts in just 11 starts as a midseason call-up for the Los Angeles Dodgers in 1992.  Since 1992, no pitcher has had four shutouts in his rookie season.   

Astacio held the record for the most career strikeouts by a member of the Colorado Rockies for nearly 10 years, recording 749 strikeouts between 1997 and 2001. The record was broken by Ubaldo Jimenez in 2011. As of the 2021 season, he stands fifth on the Rockies' career list behind Jorge de la Rosa, Jon Gray, German Marquez and  Ubaldo Jimenez.

He was also a member of the 2004 Boston Red Sox team that won the team's first World Series since 1918, although he did not play in the 2004 postseason.

See also

 List of Colorado Rockies team records
 List of Major League Baseball career hit batsmen leaders

References

Sources
 Center, Bill, "Padres, Astacio at odds", Union-Tribune, December 20, 2005.  accessed December 26, 2006.

External links

1968 births
Living people
Albuquerque Dukes players
Azucareros del Este players
Bakersfield Dodgers players
Boston Red Sox players
Colorado Rockies players
Dominican Republic expatriate baseball players in the United States
Gulf Coast Dodgers players
Gulf Coast Red Sox players
Harrisburg Senators players
Houston Astros players
Los Angeles Dodgers players
Major League Baseball pitchers
Major League Baseball players from the Dominican Republic
New Orleans Zephyrs players
New York Mets players
Pawtucket Red Sox players
People from Hato Mayor del Rey
Portland Beavers players
Portland Sea Dogs players
Potomac Nationals players
San Antonio Missions players
San Diego Padres players
St. Lucie Mets players
Texas Rangers players
Vero Beach Dodgers players
Washington Nationals players
Yakima Bears players